Ibrahim Blati Touré (born 4 August 1994) is a Burkinabé professional footballer who plays as a midfielder for Egyptian Premier League club Pyramids FC and the Burkina Faso national team.

Club career
Born in Bouaké, Touré made his senior debut with Rayo Vallecano's reserve team in 2013, in Tercera División. On 3 August 2015, after a one-year spell at Recreativo de Huelva's B-team, he joined Evian Thonon Gaillard on loan for the season.

Touré made his professional debut on 14 August 2015, starting in a 1–1 Ligue 2 away draw against AC Ajaccio. He contributed with 12 appearances during the campaign, as his side suffered relegation.

On 18 July 2016, Touré joined AC Omonia. On 13 March 2018, he switched teams and countries again after agreeing to a contract with AFC Eskilstuna.

On 29 August 2018, Touré returned to Spain after signed a contract with Córdoba CF in Segunda División. The following 11 June, he signed a three-year deal with Primeira Liga side Vitória de Guimarães.

On 29 January 2022, Touré made a return to African football after signing a contract with Pyramids FC in the Egyptian Premier League.

International career
Touré was called up to the Burkina Faso national team for the 2017 Africa Cup of Nations. He made his debut for Burkina Faso in a 2–1 friendly win over Mali. He was featured in the 2021 Africa Cup of Nations held in Cameroon.

Honours
Individual
Africa Cup of Nations Team of the Tournament: 2021

References

External links

1994 births
Living people
People from Bouaké
Ivorian people of Burkinabé descent
Sportspeople of Burkinabé descent
Citizens of Burkina Faso through descent
Burkinabé footballers
Ivorian footballers
Association football midfielders
Burkina Faso international footballers
2017 Africa Cup of Nations players
2021 Africa Cup of Nations players
Segunda División players
Tercera División players
Cypriot First Division players
Superettan players
Rayo Vallecano B players
Atlético Onubense players
Córdoba CF players
Thonon Evian Grand Genève F.C. players
AC Omonia players
AFC Eskilstuna players
Vitória S.C. players
Pyramids FC players
Burkinabé expatriate sportspeople in Spain
Ivorian expatriate sportspeople in Spain
Expatriate footballers in Spain
Burkinabé expatriate sportspeople in France
Ivorian expatriate sportspeople in France
Burkinabé expatriate sportspeople in Cyprus
Expatriate footballers in Cyprus
Ivorian expatriate sportspeople in Cyprus
Burkinabé expatriate sportspeople in Sweden
Expatriate footballers in Sweden
Ivorian expatriate sportspeople in Sweden
Burkinabé expatriate sportspeople in Portugal
Expatriate footballers in Portugal
Ivorian expatriate sportspeople in Portugal
21st-century Burkinabé people